Douglas Logdal (born October 31, 1992) is a Swedish professional ice hockey player. He played with Timrå IK in the Elitserien during the 2010–11 Elitserien season.

References

External links

1992 births
Living people
Swedish ice hockey centres
Timrå IK players
People from Södertälje
Sportspeople from Stockholm County